In the mathematical field of measure theory, an outer measure or exterior measure is a function defined on all subsets of a given set with values in the extended real numbers satisfying some additional technical conditions. The theory of outer measures was first introduced by Constantin Carathéodory to provide an abstract basis for the theory of measurable sets and countably additive measures. Carathéodory's work on outer measures found many applications in measure-theoretic set theory (outer measures are for example used in the proof of the fundamental Carathéodory's extension theorem), and was used in an essential way by Hausdorff to define a dimension-like metric invariant now called Hausdorff dimension. Outer measures are commonly used in the field of geometric measure theory.

One might expect to define a generalized measuring function  on  that fulfills the following requirements:

 Any interval of reals  has measure 
 Translation invariance:  For any set  and any real , the sets  and  have the same measure
 Countable additivity: for any sequence  of pairwise disjoint subsets of 

It turns out that these requirements are incompatible conditions; see non-measurable set.

Outer measures

such that 
 : 
 : for arbitrary subsets  of 
Note that there is no subtlety about infinite summation in this definition. Since the summands are all assumed to be nonnegative, the sequence of partial sums could only diverge by increasing without bound. So the infinite sum appearing in the definition will always be a well-defined element of  If, instead, an outer measure were allowed to take negative values, its definition would have to be modified to take into account the possibility of non-convergent infinite sums.

An alternative and equivalent definition.
 : 
 for arbitrary subsets  of

Measurability of sets relative to an outer measure

for every subset  of 

Informally, this says that a -measurable subset is one which may be used as a building block, breaking any other subset apart into pieces (namely, the piece which is inside of the measurable set together with the piece which is outside of the measurable set). In terms of the motivation for measure theory, one would expect that area, for example, should be an outer measure on the plane. One might then expect that every subset of the plane would be deemed "measurable," following the expected principle that

However, the formal logical development of the theory shows that the situation is more complicated. A formal implication of the axiom of choice is that for any definition of area as an outer measure which includes as a special case the standard formula for the area of a rectangle, there must be subsets of the plane which fail to be measurable. In particular, the above "expected principle" is false, provided that one accepts the axiom of choice.

The measure space associated to an outer measure
It is straightforward to use the above definition of -measurability to see that
 if  is -measurable then its complement  is also -measurable.

A similar proof shows that:
 if  are -measurable subsets of  then the union  and intersection  are also -measurable.

The properties given here can be summarized by the following terminology:

One thus has a measure space structure on  arising naturally from the specification of an outer measure on  This measure space has the additional property of completeness, which is contained in the following statement:
 Every subset  such that  is -measurable.
This is easy to prove by using the second property in the "alternative definition" of outer measure.

Restriction and pushforward of an outer measure
Let  be an outer measure on the set .

Pushforward
Given another set  and a map , define  by

Restriction
Define  by

Measurability of sets relative to a pushforward or restriction

Regular outer measures

Definition of a regular outer measure
Formally, this is requiring either of the following equivalent conditions:
It is automatic that the second condition implies the first; the first implies the second by considering the intersection of a minimizing sequence of subsets.

The regular outer measure associated to an outer measure
Given an outer measure  on a set , define  by

Every -measurable subset is also -measurable, and every -measurable subset of finite -measure is also -measurable.

The elements of the larger σ-algebra which are not contained in the smaller σ-algebra have infinite -measure and finite -measure.

Outer measure and topology 

If  has the property that

whenever

then  is called a metric outer measure.

Theorem.

Construction of outer measures 

There are several procedures for constructing outer measures on  a set.  The classic Munroe reference below describes two particularly useful ones which are referred to as Method I and Method II.

Method I 

Theorem. Suppose the family  and the function  are as above and  define

Method II 
The second technique is more suitable for constructing outer measures on metric spaces, since it yields metric outer measures. Suppose  is a metric space. For each , let

and

Obviously,  when  since the infimum is taken over a smaller class as  decreases. Thus

exists (possibly infinite).

This is the construction used in the definition of Hausdorff measures for a metric space.

See also 
Inner measure

Notes

References

External links 
 Outer measure at Encyclopedia of Mathematics
 Caratheodory measure at Encyclopedia of Mathematics

Measures (measure theory)